Affair of Honor is a silent film that was inspired by a famous painting. It was made 18 May 1901 in Philadelphia, Pennsylvania  by Lubin Studios.

A woman and her male friend (Arthur Marvin) are seated at a table when another woman makes romantic overtures to the man. The two women then duel with swords, and one of the women is killed.

See also
Lubin Studios
Silent film
Duel

External links

1901 films
American silent short films
American black-and-white films
Lubin Manufacturing Company films
1900s American films